The Microsoft Lumia 535 is an entry-level smartphone developed by Microsoft Mobile that runs the Windows Phone 8.1 OS and is upgradable to Windows 10 Mobile. The phone features a 5-inch display. It is equipped with a 5 MP front-facing camera. It is the first Microsoft-branded phone to be used after its acquisition of Nokia's mobile phone business.

On May 16, 2015, Microsoft released its successor, the Microsoft Lumia 540, with a better display and an improved camera.

Specifications

Hardware 

The Lumia 535 comes with a 5.0" IPS LCD display and 5 MP cameras on both the front and the back. The phone has 1 GB of RAM and 8 GB of built-in storage, and is powered by a quad-core 1.2 GHz Snapdragon 200 CPU and Adreno 302 GPU. Battery capacity is 1905 mAh and the phone is available in orange, green, white, black, gray and blue.

Software 
The Lumia 535 ships with Windows Phone 8.1 Update 2 (through the Lumia Denim update) and is upgradeable to Windows 10 Mobile.

Reception 
Jim Martin from PC Advisor wrote: "We're fans of Windows Phone 8.1 but the Lumia 535 compromises in too many areas to make it a bargain at £100. You're better off with a Motorola Moto E or – if you want 4G – the EE Kestrel."

Katharine Byrne from Expert Reviews wrote that "Microsoft's Lumia 535 is well-built, but poor battery life and a fussy touchscreen makes it frustrating to use."

According to Microsoft, the Lumia 535 became the best-selling mid-range smartphone in Pakistan.

Issues 
Since the release, users have detected numerous problems regarding the phone's touch screen. Microsoft has stated that these problems are caused by a software bug and released an update in January 2015 to fix it. Another update in March partially fixed the issue and users who are still experiencing the issue are advised to contact Microsoft Care.

See also 

Microsoft Lumia
Microsoft Lumia 532

References

External links 
 How 535 is different from 530

Microsoft Lumia
Mobile phones introduced in 2014
Discontinued smartphones
Windows Phone devices
Microsoft Lumia 535
Mobile phones with user-replaceable battery